{{Infobox election
| election_name     = 2004 United States Senate election in Indiana
| country           = Indiana
| type              = presidential
| ongoing           = no
| previous_election = 1998 United States Senate election in Indiana
| previous_year     = 1998
| next_election     = 2010 United States Senate election in Indiana
| next_year         = 2010
| election_date     = November 2, 2004

| image1            = 
| nominee1          = Evan Bayh
| party1            = Democratic Party (United States)
| popular_vote1     = 1,496,976
| percentage1       = 61.7%

| image2            = 
| nominee2          = Marvin Scott
| party2            = Republican Party (United States)
| popular_vote2     = 903,913
| percentage2       = 37.2%

| map_image         = 2004 United States Senate election in Indiana results map by county.svg
| map_size          = 250px
| map_caption       = County resultsBayh:   Scott:  
| title             = U.S. Senator
| before_election   = Evan Bayh
| before_party      = Democratic Party (United States)
| after_election    = Evan Bayh
| after_party       = Democratic Party (United States)
}}

The 2004 United States Senate election in Indiana''' was held on November 2, 2004. Incumbent Democratic U.S. Senator Evan Bayh won re-election to a second term. , this was the last time the Democrats have won the Class 3 Senate seat from Indiana. Bayh won 86 of the state's 92 counties.

Major candidates

Democratic 
 Evan Bayh, incumbent U.S. Senator

Republican 
 Marvin Scott, Professor at Butler University and nominee for IN-10 in 1994

Campaign 
In September, Bayh had $6.5 million cash on hand. Scott's strategy of trying to paint Bayh as too liberal failed to gain traction.

In early 2004, Bayh was considered a serious contender for the Vice Presidency as the running mate of Massachusetts Senator John Kerry. Although Bayh was on the final shortlist, North Carolina Senator John Edwards was ultimately chosen instead.

Bayh easily won reelection, defeating Scott by more than 24 percentage points and carrying all but six counties, even while Kerry lost the state by more than 20 percentage points in the concurrent presidential election.

General election

Predictions

Polling

Results

Overall

By county 
Bayh won 86 of Indiana's counties compared to 6 for Scott.

See also 
 2004 United States Senate elections
 2004 United States House of Representatives elections in Indiana
 2004 United States presidential election in Indiana

Notes

References

2004
Indiana
Senate
Evan Bayh